The Pepe Reyes Cup is the Gibraltarian football super cup, contested by the winners of the Gibraltar Football League and the Rock Cup at the Victoria Stadium. In the event that a team wins both the GFL and the Rock Cup, the GFL runners up will face the double winners.

The cup is dedicated to Jose Reyes, president of the Gibraltar Football Association during the 1990s.

Finals by year

Titles by team

See also 
 Gibraltar Premier Division
 Rock Cup

Notes

References

External links 
 Gibraltar FA

2000 establishments in Gibraltar
Football in Gibraltar
National association football supercups
Recurring sporting events established in 2000